Longville is an extinct town in Macon County, in the U.S. state of Missouri.

A post office called Longville was established in 1900, and remained in operation until 1904. It is unknown why the name Longville was applied to this community.

References

Ghost towns in Missouri
Former populated places in Macon County, Missouri